The Miss Universe Canada or "The Beauties of Canada" is a national beauty pageant in Canada, which sends its winners to the Miss Universe pageant.

The Beauties of Canada Organization gained the exclusive rights to send a Canadian representative to the Miss Universe Pageant in 2002. The company President is Nicaraguan-born Canadian Denis Dávila.

The Miss Universe Canada contest was first held in 2003, with the first winner being Leanne Marie Cecile. Cecile made the Top 10 in Miss Universe 2003.

Natalie Glebova was crowned the winner in 2005 and went on to become Miss Universe 2005. Glebova's successor Alice Panikian was viewed as a strong contender to win the 2006 Miss Universe crown and placed in the Top 10.

As of 2022, Canada along with France remain the only countries to send a delegate to every edition of Miss Universe since its inaugural year. Germany shared this distinction until 2020, when it withdrew due to the COVID-19 pandemic

Controversy
In 2010, Miss Universe Canada made headlines when Maria Al-Masani, the first beauty pageant contestant of Yemeni origin, competed. This was controversial due to accommodating her religious beliefs by allowing her to wear a semi-transparent sarong over her swimsuit. In 2012, CNN World News named her one of its eight "agents of change" to follow, the only Canadian to receive that designation.

The 2012 contest was accused of transphobia after disqualifying a transgender contestant, Jenna Talackova (Jana Talačková), for not being a "naturally born female". A spokesperson from Miss Universe Canada released a statement saying she was disqualified because on her entry form she stated she was born a female, which was not the case. Eventually, Talackova was let back into the competition.

After this, Sahar Biniaz dropped out of the Miss Universe pageant a few days prior to it starting, having allegedly hurt her foot. Adwoa Yamoah, the first runner-up, replaced her and competed in Miss Universe 2012.

On May 27, 2013, two days after the Miss Universe Canada 2013 pageant, it was announced that Denise Garrido was the winner. As it turned out, Garrido was actually 3rd runner-up and due to a mathematical error was named the winner. Calgary's Riza Santos was the actual winner.  During the validation of the computerized scoring results (which occurred the following day), a typo was discovered in the top five entries, which significantly impacted the final results of the competition.

Due to the pandemic, the 2021 Miss Universe Canada pageant was cancelled and the titles Miss Universe Canada 2021 and Miss International Canada 2021 were appointed to the delegates next in line. Therefore, Miss Universe Canada 2020's first runner-up Tamara Jemuovic was awarded the title of Miss Universe Canada 2021 and is set to compete in Eilat, Israel for the 70th Miss Universe pageant. Respectively, Miss Universe Canada 2020's second runner-up Jaime VandenBerg was awarded the title of Miss International Canada 2021, although the 2020 & 2021 Miss International pageants were cancelled.

Titleholders

Miss Universe Canada
 

 

Note: Sahar Biniaz did not compete at Miss Universe 2012 due to a foot injury.

Miss International Canada

The following is a list of all Miss International Canada titleholders in under Beauties of Canada or Miss Universe Canada since 2003.

Miss Canada 1952–2002

1993–2002
The Canadian Search Miss Universe or Miss Canadian Universe was hosted by Chan International Models of Edmonton until 2002. While the 2002 event was held in August 2001 in Toronto, all previous events from 1993 to 2001 were held in Edmonton.

1979–1992
The Miss Canada pageant obtained the franchise for the Miss Universe Pageant in 1978, when that year's first runner-up, Andrea Leslie Eng, competed internationally. From 1979 to the final contest, the winners of Miss Canada went on to compete. Miss Canada 1982, Karen Baldwin, being the only Miss Canada to also win Miss Universe. The show was popular in the 1970s, with up to 5 million viewers, but declined in the 1980s, until the franchise holders, Cleo Productions, closed in early 1992. Producers of the show cited mounting production costs, as the reason for cancellation. The last winner was Miss Canada 1992, Nicole Dunsdon, from Summerland, British Columbia, a speech pathology student at the University of Alberta.

1959–1977
Between 1969 and 1977 the Miss Dominion of Canada pageant originated when the Bruno family of Ancaster, Ontario obtained franchise rights to select and send Canada's exclusive representatives to Miss Universe. The winner of Miss Dominion of Canada competed in Miss Universe, Miss World, and often both Miss International and Queen of the Pacific. The Miss Universe franchise in Canada was taken over by the nationally televised Miss Canada contest in 1978.

1952–1958
In 1952, Miss Toronto 1951 competed to Miss Universe 1952. Between 1952 and 1958 Miss Universe Canada was selected by a photo contest and/or casting by Silknit Ltd. of Toronto, Canada. Most winners were former Miss Toronto Pageant winners or participants.

See also
Miss Earth Canada
Miss World Canada

References

External links
 Official Miss Universe Canada website

 
Canada
Canada
Recurring events established in 1952
Canadian awards